Prospero is a genus of bulbous flowering plants in the family Asparagaceae, subfamily Scilloideae (also treated as the family Hyacinthaceae). It is distributed in Europe, around the Mediterranean, and through the Middle East to the Caucasus.

Description

Species of Prospero grow from bulbs, the leaves and flowers appearing in the autumn and dying down in spring. The leaves are relatively narrow. Each bulb produces one to four flowering stems (scapes) bearing dense racemes of pink to violet flowers. The stamens have filaments coloured like the tepals and short purple anthers. The dark brown seeds are more-or-less oblong.

Systematics

The genus Prospero was included in a posthumously published work including names and descriptions by Richard Salisbury in 1866. However, some species then placed in the genus, such as P. hyacinthoideum and P. lingulatum, are currently placed in other genera. Franz Speta and co-workers from the 1970s onwards split up the broadly defined genus Scilla, placing many species into separate genera. The modern understanding of Prospero dates from 1982, with Speta's re-assignment of Scilla autumnalis (among other species) to Prospero.

The genus is placed in the tribe Hyacintheae (or the subfamily Hyacinthoideae by those who use the family Hyacinthaceae).

Species

, the World Checklist of Selected Plant Families recognized the following species:

Prospero autumnale (L.) Speta
Prospero battagliae Speta
Prospero corsicum (Boullu) J.-M.Tison
Prospero depressum Speta
Prospero elisae Speta
Prospero fallax (Steinh.) Speta
Prospero hanburyi (Baker) Speta
Prospero hierae C.Brullo
Prospero hierapytnense Speta
Prospero idaeum Speta
Prospero minimum Speta
Prospero obtusifolium (Poir.) Speta
Prospero paratethycum Speta
Prospero rhadamanthi Speta
Prospero talosii (Tzanoud. & Kypr.) Speta

References

Asparagaceae genera
Scilloideae